Laura Keeble (born 1977) is a British artist. She uses interventionist and subversive strategies to create pauses in perception and question societal norms. "Unfunded and unsanctioned, Laura Keeble’s work is a grassroots action of sorts; it is an art that invites civic participation and a perhaps even a little harmless disobedience." Keeble currently lives and works in Southend On Sea.

Education 
Born in Mile End, London, Keeble attended Valance Primary School, in Barking and Dagenham; Westborough Primary School, Westcliff On Sea, and Prittlewell High school. Keeble earned a BA(Hons) in Fine Art at Essex University.

Career 
As a student, Keeble began to install and document uncommissioned interventions in public and corporate-owned spaces, quickly gaining notoriety for her anti-establishment installation of Queen Victoria's Hands.
In 2007 Keeble continued her site-specific practice with a parody of Damien Hirst's work For the love of God in which she created a replica of this artwork using a plastic medical model skull with 6522 Swarovski crystals, and left discarded with a pile of rubbish bags outside the White Cube gallery the day after Hirsts' Beyond Belief had closed. It was then exhibited in Lazerides Gallery, Newcastle.

Idol Worship (2007) explored the commercialism of branding in the context of a sculptural obituary. Keeble then exhibited in "Trespass Alliance"  with the Andipa Gallery, London, with D*Face, Jose Parlour, Parla, Swoon, Slinkachu WK Interact and Charles Krafft. Idol Worship was published in "Urban Interventions", a site-specific focused publication.

Further reading 
 Urban Interventions, Eds R. Klanten, M. Huebner, March 2010 
 Trespass. A History of Uncommissioned Urban Art, Carlo McCormick, Marc and Sara Schiller, Ethel Seno, November 2010, 
 Beyond The Street. The 100 Leading Figures in Urban Art, Patrick Nguyen, Stuart Mackenzie, April 2010 
 Art and Agenda. Political Art and Activism, Editors R. Klanten, M. Hübner, A. Bieber, P. Alonzo, G. Jansen, April 2011 
 Safety Helmets Must Be Worn, Editor Madelaine Murphy, Estuarine Press, May 2011,

References

External links 
 Laura Keeble official website
 Laura Keeble's Wish you were here

1977 births
Living people
21st-century British women artists
Alumni of the University of Essex
Artists from London
People from Mile End